Logie Coldstone is a village in Aberdeenshire, Scotland. The village lies north of the River Dee, near Tarland in the Cromar, a basin of land cut out of the Grampian foothills between Aboyne and Ballater.

See also
Royal Deeside
Blelack

References

External links

 Logie Coldstone's website
 Archived history of Logie Coldstone (not, alas, very reader-friendly)

Villages in Aberdeenshire